Calamagrostis expansa is a species of grass in the family Poaceae known by the common name Maui reedgrass. It is native to Hawaii, where it is known only from Maui and the island of Hawaii. Its natural habitats are lowland moist forests and swamps. It is threatened by habitat loss.

References

External links
USDA Plants Profile
Notes on the Grasses of Hawaii, pg 21

expansa
Endemic flora of Hawaii
Biota of Hawaii (island)
Biota of Maui
Grasses of Oceania
Taxonomy articles created by Polbot